Cadogan Gardens is a street in Chelsea, London, that is part of the Cadogan Estate.

Layout
It forms a rough square, with arms leading off the east side to Sloane Street and Pavilion Road. It also connects with Cadogan Square, Cadogan Street, and Draycott Place. The layout of the street is complicated and the house-numbering system has been described as "mysterious".

Buildings
The 5-star Draycott Hotel is at no.26.

11 Cadogan Gardens is a 56 bedroom hotel. It consists of four large houses, and had been a private members club, until Lord Cadogan as freeholder acquired the leasehold in 2012 and had it converted into a hotel.

Residents
The artist Mortimer Menpes lived at number 25 from 1892 in a Japanese-styled house designed by Arthur Mackmurdo.

In the 1960s, numbers 53 and 55 were the residences of diplomats from Czechoslovakia.

References

Streets in the Royal Borough of Kensington and Chelsea
Cadogan Estate
Knightsbridge